Oh My Lord (Chinese: 惹不起的千岁大人) is a 2022 Chinese romantic costume series, starring Luo Zheng and Ji Meihan. The series is based on the novel of the same title by Jinjiang Literature. The series airs on iQIYI from February 14, 2022, and is also available on iQiyi app and iQ.com.

Synopsis 
Chen Youyou, a young girl with a strong life force is forced to get married to Bai Li, who concealed his identity as a false eunuch for many years in Fuxian City. After experience, they fall in love with each other. This is a story about love and growth.

Cast 

 Luo Zheng as Bai Li
 Ji Meihan as Chen Youyou
 Chen Ming Hao as Qi Shengwen
 Yang Yi Mo as Jiang Bihan
 Hu Wei as Gu Tian He
 Zhu Mei Ji as Xiaotiao

Production 
The series began filming in September 2021 in Hengdian.

External links 

 https://weibo.com/u/7459688516?is_hot=1
 https://movie.douban.com/subject/35559084/

References 

Mandarin-language television shows
2022 Chinese television series debuts
IQIYI original programming
2020s romance television series